Li Shan (born 21 May 1980) is a Chinese volleyball player who competed in the 2000 Summer Olympics and in the 2004 Summer Olympics.

References

1980 births
Living people
Chinese women's volleyball players
Olympic volleyball players of China
Volleyball players at the 2000 Summer Olympics
Volleyball players at the 2004 Summer Olympics
Olympic gold medalists for China
Olympic medalists in volleyball
Volleyball players from Tianjin
Asian Games medalists in volleyball
Volleyball players at the 2002 Asian Games
Volleyball players at the 2006 Asian Games
Medalists at the 2004 Summer Olympics
Asian Games gold medalists for China
Medalists at the 2002 Asian Games
Medalists at the 2006 Asian Games
21st-century Chinese women